The AN/SLQ-49 Chaff Buoy Decoy System, commonly referred to as "Rubber Duck", consists of inflatable radar-reflecting decoy buoys. It is used by the U.S. Navy, Royal Navy, and other NATO countries. The decoy is designed to seduce radar-guided anti-ship missiles by simulating the radar cross section of a ship, presenting itself as a more attractive target than the ship.

The system is deployed in pairs. The deployment process takes a few seconds. When deployed, the system launches into the water two octahedron-shaped inflatable decoy floats, connected by a  cable. They can last up to 3 hours in sea state 4.

The AN/SLQ-49 has been in operation since 1985. Originally designed to confuse or distract enemy radar operators, it has demonstrated effective missile seduction capabilities.

With the perceived lack of an adversary naval power following the collapse of the Soviet Union, the AN/SLQ-49 was phased out of U.S. Navy service in the 1990s. It has since been replaced with the Naval Decoy IDS300.

See also 
 Electronic warfare
 Electronic countermeasures
 Naval Decoy IDS300

References

External links 
 AN/SLQ-49 Chaff Buoy Decoy System at fas.org
 AN/SLQ-49 Chaff Buoy Decoy System at globalsecurity.org
 Fathom Jan-Mar 2000 article on accidental firings of SLQ-49s

Electronic warfare equipment
Military decoys
Military electronics of the United States
Naval warfare